Emiliano Romero Clavijo (born 30 September 1992) is a Uruguayan professional footballer who plays as a midfielder for Atlético de Rafaela.

Career
Romero's career began in 2012 with Uruguayan Primera División club Juventud, he made his debut for Juventud in a league match on 25 August 2012 against River Plate. Seven matches later, against Montevideo Wanderers, Romero received his first red card of his career. Ten months later he scored his first goal, in a Primera División game against Defensor Sporting. In January 2016, Romero left Uruguayan football to join Argentine Primera División side Atlético de Rafaela on loan. He subsequently made fifty-one appearances between joining and June 2017; during which the club signed Romero permanently. On 24 March 2021, Romero joined fellow league club Belgrano on a loan deal for the rest of the year.

Career statistics
.

References

External links
 

1992 births
Living people
People from Santa Lucía, Uruguay
Uruguayan footballers
Uruguayan expatriate footballers
Uruguayan expatriate sportspeople in Argentina
Expatriate footballers in Argentina
Association football midfielders
Uruguayan Primera División players
Argentine Primera División players
Primera Nacional players
Juventud de Las Piedras players
Atlético de Rafaela footballers
Club Atlético Belgrano footballers